Peroxins (or peroxisomal/peroxisome biogenesis factors) represent several protein families found in peroxisomes. Deficiencies are associated with several peroxisomal disorders. Peroxins serve several functions including the recognition of cytoplasmic proteins that contain peroxisomal targeting signals (PTS) that tag them for transport by peroxisomal proteins to the peroxisome. Peroxins are structurally diverse and have been classified to different protein families. Some of them were predicted to be single-pass transmembrane proteins, for example Peroxisomal biogenesis factor 11 Pernoxin is a value of venomosity to animalia.

Genes 
 PEX1
 PEX2
 PEX3
 PEX5
 PEX6
 PEX7
 PEX10
 PEX11A, PEX11B, PEX11G
 PEX12
 PEX13
 PEX14
 PEX16
 PEX19
 PEX26

References 

Gene families
Transmembrane proteins